Hugh S. Jenkins (March 9, 1903 – June 18, 1976) was Ohio Attorney General from 1945 to 1949.

Jenkins was born March 9, 1903, in New Cumberland, West Virginia, to John T. and Vanessa (Miskelly) Jenkins. He was a Republican from Mahoning County. Before election as Attorney General, he was chairman of Ohio's Board of Tax Appeals and was administrator of the Ohio State Bureau of Unemployment Compensation.

Jenkins was elected as Attorney General in 1944 and 1946, but lost re-election in 1948.

Jenkins died in Columbus, Ohio, June 18, 1976, and is buried at Union Cemetery.

References

External links

Ohio Attorneys General
Ohio Republicans
People from Mahoning County, Ohio
1903 births
1976 deaths
20th-century American lawyers
20th-century American politicians
People from New Cumberland, West Virginia